We Can't Stand Sitting Down is the second studio album by the Christian pop punk band, Stellar Kart.  The album was officially released on July 25, 2006 under Word Entertainment records.

The song "Me and Jesus" won the 2007 Dove Award for "Rock/Contemporary Recorded Song".

Track listing

Personnel
Adam Agee - lead vocals, guitar
Cody Pellerin - guitar
Brian Calcara - bass guitar
Jordan Messer - drums

Awards 
In 2007, the album was nominated for a Dove Award for Rock/Contemporary Album of the Year at the 38th GMA Dove Awards.

Music videos

References

2006 albums
Stellar Kart albums